JSC Angara Airlines is an airline based in Irkutsk, Russia.

Overview
Established in 2000, it operates on behalf of its owner, the Irkut Corporation aircraft repair factory out of Irkutsk International Airport. With base airports in Irkutsk and Novosibirsk, Angara Airlines operates scheduled flights in the Siberian region and to other regions in the Russian Federation, and topping it off with one international connection, to Manzhouli, China. Besides the scheduled flights, Angara Airlines also offers charter transportation, VIP transportation and freight and mail services.

In July 2017, it was announced that the airline had signed a letter of intent for 3 Irkut MC-21-300s at the MAKS Air Show in Moscow. The airline has yet to decide which engines will be chosen for the aircraft. The aircraft, when an order is placed, were originally scheduled to be delivered from 2022 to 2025.

Destinations

As of May 2022, Angara Airlines serves the following destinations:

Russia
Bodaybo - Bodaybo Airport
Bratsk - Bratsk Airport
Chara - Chara Airport 
Chita - Kadala Airport
Erbogachen - Erbogachen Airport
Irkutsk - Irkutsk International Airport 
Kirensk -  Kirensk Airport
Khabarovsk - Khabarovsk Novy Airport
Lensk- Lensk Airport
Mama - Mama Airport
Nizhneangarsk - Nizhneangarsk Airport
Talakan - Talakan Airport
Taksimo - Taksimo Airport
Ulan-Ude - Baikal International Airport
Ust-Kut - Ust-Kut Airport
Yakutia - Talakan Airport

Fleet
The Angara Airlines fleet includes the following aircraft (as of May 2022):

Accidents
 

27 June 2019: Angara Airlines Flight 200, an Antonov An-24 (registration RA-47366) operating a flight from Nizhneangarsk to Ulan-Ude, Russia, suffered an engine failure shortly after takeoff. The aircraft skidded off the runway after attempting to make an emergency landing, then hit a building and caught fire. Of the 47 people on board, 2 crew members were killed and 7 others were injured. The aircraft was written off.

References

External links

Airlines of Russia
Companies based in Irkutsk
Airlines established in 2000
2000 establishments in Russia
Russian brands